Norman Joel Greenbaum (born November 20, 1942) is an American singer-songwriter. He is primarily known for his 1969 song "Spirit in the Sky".

Early life 
Greenbaum was born in Malden, Massachusetts. He was raised in an Orthodox Jewish household and attended Hebrew school at Congregation Beth Israel. His initial interest in music was sparked by Southern blues music and the folk music that was popular in the late 1950s and early 1960s. He performed with various bands in high school and studied music at Boston University for two years. In college he performed at local coffeehouses but eventually dropped out and moved to Los Angeles in 1965.

Career 
In the late 1960s Norman Greenbaum was the leader and composer for Dr. West's Medicine Show and Junk Band, which recorded the novelty hit "The Eggplant That Ate Chicago". The group's psychedelic approach was too eccentric for mainstream show business; the group's name suggested a novelty or comedy act incorporating music.

Greenbaum went solo as a folk artist and submitted an original song, "Spirit in the Sky", to Reprise Records. His demonstration recording was a simple folk rendition, with Greenbaum accompanying himself on acoustic guitar. Reprise handed Greenbaum to staff producer Erik Jacobsen, who radically rearranged the song for a new recording session. The updated version now had pulsing electric guitar, gospel-styled backup singers, and an insistent rhythm accompanying Greenbaum, whose vocal was now double-tracked. Reprise released the record in late 1969, and it skyrocketed to #1 in almost all worldwide markets. It sold two million copies in 1969 and 1970, and received a gold disc from the RIAA. It has subsequently been used in many films, advertisements, and television shows.

Although "Spirit in the Sky" has a clear Christian theme, Greenbaum was and remains an observant Jew. Greenbaum says he was inspired to write the song after watching country singers singing a song on television. In an interview Greenbaum stated that Western movies were the real inspiration for "Spirit in the Sky":

Norman Greenbaum: If you ask me what I based "Spirit in the Sky" on ... what did we grow up watching? Westerns! These mean and nasty varmints get shot and they wanted to die with their boots on. So to me that was spiritual, they wanted to die with their boots on.
Ray Shasho: So that was the trigger that got you to write the song?
Norman Greenbaum: Yes. The song itself was simple, when you're writing a song you keep it simple of course. It wasn't like a Christian song of praise it was just a simple song. I had to use Christianity because I had to use something. But more important it wasn't the Jesus part, it was the spirit in the sky. Funny enough ... I wanted to die with my boots on.

All of the accoutrements added to "Spirit in the Sky" in the recording studio made it impossible for Greenbaum to replicate the recording in live performances. His televised appearance on Dick Clark's American Bandstand compelled the singer to synchronize his performance to a playback of the hit record.

Though Norman Greenbaum is generally regarded as a one-hit wonder, he actually had two hits: the upbeat "Canned Ham" followed in 1970, and the record reached number 46 on the American charts and number 26 in the Canadian charts.

Personal life 
Greenbaum has been a long-time resident of Santa Rosa, California. He was critically injured when a car, in which he was a passenger, made a left turn in the path of a motorcycle on Occidental Road on March 28, 2015, killing the motorcyclist and injuring the motorcycle passenger. Greenbaum has since gone back to performing.

Discography

Albums

With Dr. West's Medicine Show and Junk Band 
 The Eggplant That Ate Chicago (1967)
 Norman Greenbaum with Dr. West's Medicine Show and Junk Band (1969, compilation)
 Euphoria: The Best of Dr. West's Medicine Show and Junk Band (1998, compilation

Solo 
 Spirit in the Sky (1969)
 Back Home Again (1970)
 Petaluma (1972)
 Spirit in the Sky: The Best of Norman Greenbaum (1995, compilation)
 Spirit in the Sky: The Best of Norman Greenbaum (1997, compilation)
 Spirit in the Sky: The Definitive Anthology (2003, compilation)

Singles

See also 
 List of 1970s one-hit wonders in the United States

References

External links 
 
 
 
 
 Norman Greenbaum with Dr. West's Medicine Show and Junk Band album at the Internet Archive

1942 births
Living people
Jewish singers
American male singers
Boston University College of Fine Arts alumni
Jewish American musicians
American Orthodox Jews
People from Malden, Massachusetts
People from Santa Rosa, California
Songwriters from Massachusetts
Reprise Records artists
Jewish rock musicians
Songwriters from California
Catholics from Massachusetts
Catholics from Louisiana
21st-century American Jews
American male songwriters